Zouches Farm transmitting station is a microwave radio link site located near the top of Blows Downs at Zouches Farm, Caddington, Bedfordshire, England. It was part of the London to Birmingham chain designed in the 1940s, and is now owned and maintained by BT Group.

In September 1970, short segments of the BBC Television series Doctor Who were filmed at the relay station, for a serial entitled Terror of the Autons.

Transmitted services

Analogue radio

Digital radio

† Awarded by not yet launched.

References

External links
 Zouches Farm at The Transmission Gallery
 doctorwholocations.net - Zouches Farm Relay Station

Communication towers in the United Kingdom
Transmitter sites in England
Buildings and structures in Bedfordshire
Mass media in Bedfordshire
Chiltern Hills
British Telecom buildings and structures